Jarrid Williams (born July 2, 1997) is an American football offensive tackle for the Philadelphia Eagles of the National Football League (NFL). He played college football at Houston and Miami.

Early life and education
Williams grew up in Cedar Hill, Texas and attended Cedar Hill High School, were he earned varsity letters in two years. He played defense and made 109 total tackles on the football team, being named second-team all-district in 2014. He was a two-star recruit according to Rivals.com, Scout.com, and 247Sports.

Williams committed to the University of Houston and spent his first season (2015) as a redshirt. In 2016, he played in eight games. Williams appeared in three games during the 2017 season. In 2018, he earned a starting role, playing as starter in thirteen games. He started four games in 2019 before suffering a season-ending injury.

In 2020, Williams announced his intention to graduate transfer. In June of that year, Williams transferred to the University of Miami. As a redshirt-senior with Miami, Williams started in every game. In 2021, Williams announced he would return for a seventh season of college football, as an extra year of eligibility was given due to COVID-19.

Professional career

Philadelphia Eagles
After going unselected in the 2022 NFL Draft, Williams was signed by the Philadelphia Eagles as an undrafted free agent. He was released on July 27. He was brought back on August 7, 2022. Williams was released for the second time on August 23. On September 16, the Eagles signed Williams to the practice squad. Later being placed on the practice squad injured reserve list, he was released along with Auden Tate on November 22.

Detroit Lions
On December 29, 2022, Williams was signed to the Detroit Lions practice squad.

Philadelphia Eagles (second stint)
On January 24, 2023, Williams signed a reserve/future contract with the Philadelphia Eagles.

References

External links
 Houston Cougars bio
 Miami Hurricanes bio

1997 births
Living people
American football offensive tackles
Detroit Lions players
Houston Cougars football players
Miami Hurricanes football players
People from Cedar Hill, Texas
Philadelphia Eagles players
Players of American football from Texas
Sportspeople from the Dallas–Fort Worth metroplex